Scott Barchard Wilson (1865–1923) was a British ornithologist and explorer.

Wilson was the son of the chemist George Fergusson Wilson. In 1887, he was sent by his professor Alfred Newton to study and collect birds in Hawaii. On his return he wrote Aves Hawaiienses (1890-1899) with Arthur Humble Evans, illustrated by Frederick William Frohawk.

References
 Fuller, Errol (2000): Extinct Birds, 2nd edition. Oxford University Press, Oxford.

Notes

1865 births
1923 deaths
British ornithologists